Dzhangamakhi (Dargwa: Жангамахьи) is a rural locality (a selo) and the administrative centre of Dzhangamakhinsky Selsoviet, Levashinsky District, Republic of Dagestan, Russia. The population was 698 as of 2010. There are 16 streets.

Geography 
Dzhangamakhi is located 10 km northeast of Levashi (the district's administrative centre) by road. Elakatmakhi is the nearest rural locality.

Nationalities 
Dargins live there.

References 

Rural localities in Levashinsky District